The 2018–19 National League 2 South is the tenth season (32nd overall) of the fourth tier (south) of the English domestic rugby union competitions since the professionalised format of the second division was introduced.  At the end of the season, Rams became champions when they won away to Clifton on 6 April 2019, sealing promotion with two games to go.  It was a fitting reward for the Berkshire club, who were by far the strongest side in the division.  The runners up were Canterbury who claimed second spot after beating off stiff competition from the likes of Tonbridge Juddians and Henley Hawks.  Despite finishing 21 points behind Rams, Canterbury's league results were still strong enough to enough to book a home promotion playoff against National League 2 North runners up, Chester. On 4 May 2019, Canterbury defeated Chester 19–10 to join Rams in the 2019–20 National League 1.  For both clubs, National League 1 is the highest level they have ever reached since the leagues began back in 1987.

At the other end of the table, London Irish Wild Geese became the first team to be relegated after they suffered a heavy loss away to Henley Hawks on 30 March 2019.  They were followed a week later by league newcomers Guernsey, who also went down after just one season, following a heavy defeat away to Henley on 6 April 2019.  One week later still, Birmingham & Solihull became the third and final team to go down with one round still to play after they lost away to champions, Rams, on 13 April 2019, with a try bonus not enough to keep them up due to results elsewhere.  London Irish Wild Geese and Guernsey will drop into London & South East Premier, while Birmingham & Solihull, who had initially been supposed to drop to Midlands Premier, decided to become an amateur club and drop out of the league system altogether. 

A final point of note was Worthing's Matthew McLean, who once again finished as the league's top scorer – this time for a record-breaking 3rd time.  McLean scored 341 points, including 22 tries – an outstanding total for a Worthing side that finished 9th.

Structure
The league consists of sixteen teams with all the teams playing each other on a home and away basis to make a total of thirty matches each. There is one automatic promotion place, one play-off place and three relegation places. The champions are promoted to the 2019–20 National League 1 and the runners-up play the second-placed team in the 2018–19 National League 2 North with the winner being promoted. The last three teams are relegated to either London & South East Premier or South West Premier depending on the geographical location of the team (in some cases teams may join the Midlands regional leagues).

The results of the matches contribute points to the league as follows:

4 points are awarded for a win
2 points are awarded for a draw
0 points are awarded for a loss, however
1 losing (bonus) point is awarded to a team that loses a match by 7 points or fewer
1 additional (bonus) point is awarded to a team scoring 4 tries or more in a match.

Participating teams and locations
Eleven of the teams listed below participated in the 2017–18 National League 2 South season.  The 2017–18 champions Cinderford and play-off winners Chinnor, who won the promotion play-off against Sedgley Park, were promoted into the 2018–19 National League 1, while Old Albanian were relegated into the division from the 2017–18 National League 1.  Sides relegated from the 2017–18 National League 2 South included Broadstreet (to Midlands Premier), Wimbledon (London & South East Premier) and Barnstaple (South West Premier).

The promoted teams are Dings Crusaders who finished as champions of South West Premier while Barnes (champions) and Guernsey (play-off) came up from London & South East Premier.  Birmingham & Solihull were also included from the division when they were level transferred from National League 2 North having been promoted as champions of Midlands Premier.  They were transferred to address an imbalance of teams in National League 2 caused by both Cinderford and Chinnor being promoted, with only Old Albanian dropping down to the south, and as the most southerly club in the northern division, Birmingham & Solihull were deemed the most suitable for a level transfer.

League table

Fixture & Results

Round 1

Round 2

Round 3

Round 4

Round 5

Round 6

Round 7

Round 8

Round 9

Round 10

Round 11

Round 12

Round 13

Round 14

Round 15

Round 16

Round 17

Round 18

Round 19

Round 20

Round 21

Postponed due to poor weather (snow).  Game to be rescheduled for 23 February 2019.

Postponed due to poor weather (snow).  Game to be rescheduled for 23 February 2019.

Postponed due to poor weather (snow).  Game to be rescheduled for 23 February 2019.

Round 22

Round 23

Round 21 (rescheduled games)

Game rescheduled from 2 February 2019.

Game rescheduled from 2 February 2019.

Game rescheduled from 2 February 2019.

Round 24

Round 25

Round 26

Round 27

London Irish Wild Geese are relegated.

Round 28

Guernsey are relegated.

Rams are champions.

Round 29

Birmingham & Solihull are relegated.

Canterbury qualify for promotion play-off.

Round 30

Promotion play-off

Each season, the runners-up in the National League 2 North and National League 2 South participate in a play-off for promotion to National League 1.  Canterbury were runners up in the 2018–19 National League 2 South, and because they had a better record than the 2018–19 National League 2 North runners up, Chester, they host the play-off match.

Attendances
 Does not include promotion play-off.

Individual statistics
 Note that points scorers includes tries as well as conversions, penalties and drop goals. Appearance figures also include coming on as substitutes (unused substitutes not included). Does not include promotion play-off.

Top points scorers

Top try scorers

Season records

Team
Largest home win — 56 points
56 – 0 Old Albanian at home to London Irish Wild Geese on 8 December 2018
Largest away win — 56 points
61 – 5 Old Albanian away to London Irish Wild Geese on 6 April 2019
Most points scored — 70 points
70 – 26	Bury St Edmunds at home to Guernsey on 15 September 2018
Most tries in a match — 12
Bury St Edmunds at home to Guernsey on 15 September 2018
Most conversions in a match — 9
Worthing Raiders at home to Redruth on 15 September 2018
Most penalties in a match — 5
Tonbridge Juddians at home Old Redcliffians on 3 November 2018
Most drop goals in a match — 1 (3)
Old Albanian away to Barnes on 15 September 2018
Clifton away to Canterbury on 20 October 2018
Old Redcliffians away to Redruth on 15 December 2018

Attendances
Highest — 1,160
Henley Hawks at home to Rams on 5 January 2019
Lowest — 68
Old Redcliffians at home to Worthing Raiders on 8 December 2018
Highest average attendance — 607
Redruth
Lowest average attendance — 161
Clifton

Player
Most points in a match — 34
 Daniel Watt for Old Albanian away to London Irish Wild Geese on 6 April 2019
Most tries in a match — 5
 Henry Bird for Old Redcliffians at home to Guernsey on 17 November 2018
Most conversions in a match — 9
 Matthew McLean for Worthing Raiders at home to Redruth on 15 September 2018
Most penalties in a match — 5
 Will Robinson for Tonbridge Juddians at home to Old Redcliffians on 3 November 2018
Most drop goals in a match — 1 (3)
 Tom Bednall for Old Albanian away to Barnes on 15 September 2018
 Bradley Barnes for Clifton away to Canterbury on 20 October 2018
 Kieran Hill for Old Redcliffians away to Redruth on 15 December 2018

Notes

See also
 English rugby union system
 Rugby union in England

References

External links
 NCA Rugby

2018–19
4S